Justvik Church is a parish church of the Church of Norway in Kristiansand Municipality in Agder county, Norway. It is located in the village of Justvik, just north of the centre of the city of Kristiansand. It is one of the churches for the Oddernes parish which is part of the Kristiansand domprosti (arch-deanery) in the Diocese of Agder og Telemark. The tan brick church was built in a rectangular design in 1996 using plans drawn up by the architect Ernst Aukland. The church seats about 275 people. The church was consecrated on 29 December 1996 by the Bishop.

Media gallery

See also
List of churches in Agder og Telemark

References

Churches in Kristiansand
Brick churches in Norway
20th-century Church of Norway church buildings
Churches completed in 1996
1996 establishments in Norway